Yoo Eun Sook (Hangul:유은숙) is a Korean voice actor.

She joined the Munhwa Broadcasting Corporation's voice acting division in 1994.

Roles

Broadcast TV
24 (television) (replacing Lourdes Benedicto by Season 2, Korea TV Edition, MBC)
Galuxy Railroad 999 (Korea TV Edition, MBC)
Chokomi (MBC)
Bakuretsu Hunter (Korea TV Edition, MBC)

Movie dubbing
Sky Captain and the World of Tomorrow (replacing Angelina Jolie, Korea TV Edition, MBC)

See also
Munhwa Broadcasting Corporation
MBC Voice Acting Division

Home page
Yoo Eun Sook Homepage (Siren) (in Korean)
MBC Voice Acting Division Yoo Eun Sook Blog (in Korean)

Living people
South Korean voice actresses
Year of birth missing (living people)